Gifford Hill is a hill located at the southern boundary of the Town of Spafford, in Onondaga County, in the U.S. state of New York. It is a section of Spafford Forest.  Not contiguous to the larger portion of the preserve, it does not provide public trails.  Situated south of South Spafford, there is no public vehicular access to this county land.

External links
 Onondaga County Parks

Landforms of Onondaga County, New York
Hills of New York (state)